CA-7 is a job scheduling / workflow automation software package sold by CA Technologies (formerly CA, Inc. and Computer Associates International, Inc.). It is commonly used by banks and other large enterprises with IBM mainframe IT computing platforms. In 1987, Computer Associates took ownership of the product when it acquired its archrival, UCCEL Corporation. CA subsequently renamed it from UCC-7 to CA-7, as was done with product prefixes for UCC-1 (tape library  management) and UCC-11 (batch job rerun/restart), etc.

References

External links 
https://www.broadcom.com/products/mainframe/intelligent-ops-automation/automation/ca7-workload-automation 
 https://www.theregister.co.uk/2012/06/28/rbs_job_cuts_and_offshoring_software_glitch/
 http://businessetc.thejournal.ie/ulster-bank-backlog-banking-customers-royal-bank-of-scotland-507284-Jul2012/
 https://web.archive.org/web/20160304043734/http://supportconnectw.ca.com/public/ca-7/ca-7/infodocs/ca7-r11datasheet.pdf
 http://www.siliconrepublic.com/strategy/item/27990-rbs-may-sue-ca-over-softwar

Workflow applications
CA Technologies
IBM mainframe software